Carlo II Tocco (died 1448) was the ruler of Epirus from 1429 until his death.

Life
Carlo II was the son of Leonardo II Tocco, the younger brother and co-ruler of Carlo I Tocco, count of Cephalonia and Zante, duke of Leukas, and ruler of Epirus.  In 1424 Carlo II and his sisters were adopted by their uncle Carlo I.  Carlo II's sister Maddalena Tocco  married the future Byzantine Emperor Constantine XI Palaiologos in 1428, but died in 1429.

In July 1429 Carlo II succeeded his uncle Carlo I in all his jurisdictions.  His succession was opposed, however, by Carlo I's illegitimate sons, led by Memnone.  Memnone and his brothers appealed to the Ottoman Sultan Murad II for help in securing the inheritance of their father, and the sultan duly sent forth a force under Sinan.  The Ottoman general entered into negotiations with the anti-Latin faction in Ioannina and, after guaranteeing the privileges of the nobility, obtained the surrender of the city on October 9, 1430.

Carlo II continued to rule over the remnants of his principality in Epirus from Arta as an Ottoman vassal, while the illegitimate sons of his uncle received holdings in Acarnania as Ottoman dependents.  Carlo II died in October 1448 and was succeeded by his son Leonardo III Tocco. After the Ottoman conquest, the Tocco territories became a sanjak under the name of "Karlı İli", derived from Carlo II.

Family
By his marriage to Ramondina of Ventimiglia, Carlo II Tocco had four children:
 Leonardo III Tocco, who succeeded as ruler of Epirus
 Giovanni Tocco
 Antonio Tocco
 Elvira Tocco

He married a daughter of Maurice Spata sometime after 1415.

References

Sources 

 
 
 
 
 
 
 

1448 deaths
15th-century despots of Epirus
Tocco family
Adoptees
Counts palatine of Cephalonia and Zakynthos
Year of birth unknown